
This is a list of postal codes in Canada where the first letter is E. Postal codes beginning with E are located within the Canadian province of New Brunswick. Only the first three characters are listed, corresponding to the Forward Sortation Area.

Canada Post provides a free postal code look-up tool on its website, via its mobile apps for such smartphones as the iPhone and BlackBerry,  and sells hard-copy directories and CD-ROMs. Many vendors also sell validation tools, which allow customers to properly match addresses and postal codes. Hard-copy directories can also be consulted in all post offices, and some libraries.

New Brunswick - 112 FSAs
All rural codes in the province have been phased out; as such, no postal codes begin with E0.

Most populated FSAs
E1A, 34,082
E3B, 32,344
E3A, 32,049
E1C, 24,525
E2M, 19,403

Least populated FSAs
E2R, 33
E5V, 824
E5E, 1,056
E6H, 1,254
E6A, 1,341

References

Communications in New Brunswick
E
Postal codes E